The first season of the American reality series Bar Rescue premiered on Spike on July 17, 2011 and concluded on September 18, 2011 with a total of 10 episodes. The series stars renowned nightlife consultant Jon Taffer who offers his professional expertise plus renovations and equipment to desperately failing bars in order to save them from closing.

Experts
 Jon Taffer – Host/Star/Bar Consultant/Recon Spy
 Nicole Taffer – Host's Wife/Marketing/Recon Spy

Chefs
 Brian Duffy
 Josh Capon
 Brian Hill
 Spike Mendelsohn
 Eric Greenspan

Mixologists
 Michael Tipps
 Keith Raimondi
 Elayne Duke
 Tobin Ellis
Peter O’Connor

Other special experts
Nancy Hadley – Concept/Interior Design
Deborah Maguire – Hospitality
Ed Warnick – Retired Health Inspector

Production
Spike originally picked the series up for 10 episodes in January 2011 but was reduced to 8 episodes. The show began shooting in April 2011.

Episodes

Notes

References

External links
 
 Bar Rescue Updates — Unaffiliated site that keeps track of bars being open or closed and has updates for each bar

2011 American television seasons
Bar Rescue